Legal matters relate to the system of law governing a society.

Legal also may refer to:

Law
 Principle of legality
 Legal education 
 Legal awareness 
 Legalism (disambiguation)

Arts and entertainment
 Legal (Gal Costa album) (1970)
 Legal (Special Ed album) (1990)
 "Legal" (song), by Snow
 "Legal" (CSI episode), in CSI:Miami television series

Other uses
 Legal (constituency), functional constituency in Hong Kong 
 Legal, a cannabis-infused beverage sold by Mirth Provisions
 Legal, Alberta, Canada
 Légal Trap, a chess opening trap
 Legal size, a paper size